Chaa-Kholsky District (Çaa-Xöl kojuun) is an administrative and municipal district (raion, or kozhuun), one of the seventeen in the Tuva Republic, Russia. It is located in the west of the republic. Its administrative center is the rural locality (a selo) of Chaa-Khol. Population:  6,532 (2002 Census). The population of Chaa-Khol accounts for 53.8% of the district's total population.

History
Chaa-Kholsky District was established in 1941. In 1961, the district was abolished and merged with Ulug-Khemsky District. Chaa-Kholsky District was restored in 1992.

References

Notes

Sources

Districts of Tuva
States and territories established in 1941
States and territories disestablished in 1961
States and territories established in 1992

